Hoseynabad-e Rostam (also Romanized as Ḩoseynābād-e Rostam; also known as Ḩoseynābād) is a village in Rostam-e Seh Rural District, Sorna District, Rostam County, Fars Province, Iran. At the 2006 census, its population was 1,450, in 269 families.

References 

Populated places in Rostam County